Yam O is a bay located on the northeast shore of Lantau Island, in the New Territories of Hong Kong. It is part of the Ma Wan constituency of the Tsuen Wan District Council.

Yam O was the only natural lumber preservation zone in Hong Kong. Even today, travellers passing through Yam O can see natural lumber on stilts in the bay.

Today, Yam O is known for its interchange for the Disneyland Resort line via the nearby Sunny Bay MTR station, built on reclaimed land near Yam O.

History
Plans were made in the PADS (Port and Airport Development Strategy) of 1989 to reclaim the bay for ancillary port facilities. The bay was eventually reclaimed in the 2000s under the Northeast Lantau Development Strategy to accommodate a tourism gateway to Hong Kong Disneyland; this included Sunny Bay station.

Sunny Bay

Sunny Bay is a recent incarnation by the Hong Kong Government, which emerged after the plans to build Hong Kong Disneyland Resort on nearby Penny's Bay. This was done so because Yam in Cantonese literally means dark (the same word as the Mandarin yin, well known to most English speakers from the expression yin-yang); while Yan means happy - a significantly more favorable name to Disney. But according to Shuowen Jiezi, Yam originally is a geographical syntax which means "North of a hill or south of a body of water", so the change of the name is seen a violation of local culture and opposed by Hong Kong citizens and some Chinese language professionals.

Sunny Bay station is today also a transport interchange for Discovery Bay residents, being served by bus route DB03R.

See also
 Tsing Chau Tsai Peninsula
 Luk Keng Village
 List of places in Hong Kong

External links

 Map of Yam O and Penny's Bay by the MTR
Map of Yam O and vicinity by Centamap.com

 
Bays of Hong Kong
Places in Hong Kong
Lantau Island
Tsuen Wan District